Liometopum venerarium is an extinct species of Miocene ants in the genus Liometopum. Described by Heer in 1864, fossils of the species were found in Switzerland.

References

†
Miocene insects
Prehistoric insects of Europe
Fossil taxa described in 1864
Fossil ant taxa